Muhammad Abdul Hafiz is a judge of the High Court Division of Bangladesh Supreme Court.

Early life 
Hafiz was born on 1 June 1967. He completed his bachelor's degree and masters at the University of Dhaka.

Career 
Hafiz joined the Dhaka District court in 1982.

In 1985, Hafiz became a lawyer of the High Court Division of Bangladesh Supreme Court.

Hafiz was appointed to the High Court Division as an Additional Judge on 27 April 2004.

On 27 April 2005, Hafiz was made a permanent judge of the High Court Division of Bangladesh Supreme Court.

Hafiz and Justice AKM Fazlur Rahman on 6 May 2010, granted bail to 11 accused in the Shamim Reza Rubel murder. On 7 July 2010, Hafiz and Justice Afzal Hossain Ahmed granted bail to 13 activists of Bangladesh Jatiyatabadi Chhatra Dal in case filled by activist of Bangladesh Chhatra League who alleged they were attacked by the accused in Madhur Canteen of the University of Dhaka. On the same day Justice Afzal Hossain Ahmed granted bail to eight members of Bangladesh Jamaat-e-Islami.

On 8 June 2011, Hafiz and Justice Sheikh Rezowan Ali granted bail to Abdus Salam Pintu and Nasiruddin Ahmed Pintu, Bangladesh Nationalist Party politicians, in two separate hearings that day.

On 28 August 2018, Hafiz and Justice Bhishmadev Chakrabortty granted bail to Amir Khasru Mahmud Chowdhury, politician of Bangladesh Nationalist Party. The same day they asked the government of Bangladesh to return the passport of the Mayor of Sylhet, Ariful Haque Choudhury, back to him. On 4 October, Hafiz and Justice Kashefa Hussain granted bail to 11 politicians of Bangladesh Nationalist Party,  Abdul Moyeen Khan, Amanullah Aman, Gayeshwar Chandra Roy, Mirza Fakhrul Islam Alamgir, Mirza Abbas, Nazrul Islam Khan, and Ruhul Kuddus Talukder Dulu on sedition charges. On 22 October Hafiz and Justice Mohi Uddin Shamim granted bail barrister Mainul Hosein in two separate defamation cases.

On 21 January 2019, Hafiz and Justice Mohi Uddin Shamim granted bail to two journalist accused in a Digital Security Act case filed by Upazila Nirbahi Officer of Batiaghata Upazila, Debashish Chowdhury. Hafiz and Justice Kashefa Hussain granted bail to former Prime Minister Khaleda Zia on 18 June 2019. On 26 November 2019, Hafiz and Justice Kazi Md Ejarul Haque Akondo extended the bail to former Prime Minister Khaleda Zia by one year in a defamation case filed by Bangladesh Jananetri Parishad.

Hafiz and Justice Muhammad Mahbub Ul Islam on 11 October 2020 granted bail to an accused in a Digital Security Act case for posting an offensive status about first President of Bangladesh Sheikh Mujibur Rahman and Prime Minister of India Narendra Modi.

Hafiz and Justice Mohammad Ali on 17 June 2021 granted bail to Nipun Roy Chowdhury, a Bangladesh Nationalist Party politician and daughter-in-law of Gayeshwar Roy, in three cases which were filed after a recording of her phone call was released. On 28 September 2021, Hafiz and Justice Mohammad Ali extended the bail granted to former Prime Minister Khaleda Zia by five years.

References 

Living people
1967 births
University of Dhaka alumni
20th-century Bangladeshi lawyers
Supreme Court of Bangladesh justices
21st-century Bangladeshi judges